Flora of Connecticut that are considered endangered species.

Key
E - Endangered
T - Threatened
SC - Special Concern
SCE - Special Concern, believed extirpated

Adoxaceae (Moschatel family)
Viburnum nudum (Possum haw, SCE) 
Viburnum prunifolium (Smooth black-haw, T)

Alismataceae (Water-plaintain family)
Echinodorus tenellus (Bur-head, E)   Helanthium tenellum 
Sagittaria cuneata (Northern arrowhead, E)
Sagittaria subulata (Awl-leaved arrowhead, SC) 
Sagittaria teres (Quill-leaved arrowhead, E)

Amaranthaceae (Amaranth family)
Amaranthus pumilus (Sea-beach amaranth, SCE, federally threatened) 
Atriplex glabriuscula (Bracted orache, SC) 
Chenopodium rubrum (Red goosefoot, SCE) a.k.a. Oxybasis rubra

Anacardiaceae (Cashew or sumac family)
Rhus aromatica (Fragrant sumac, SCE, Native populations only)

Apiaceae a.k.a. Umbelliferae (Celery, carrot or parsley family)
Angelica lucida (Sea-coast angelica, E)
Angelica venenosa (Hairy angelica, SCE)
Ligusticum scoticum (Scotch lovage, E)
Lilaeopsis chinensis (Lilaeopsis, SC)
Taenidia integerrima (Yellow pimpernel, E)
Zizia aptera (Golden Alexanders, E)

Apocynaceae (Dogbane family)
Asclepias purpurascens (Purple milkweed, SC)
Asclepias variegata (White milkweed, SCE)
Asclepias viridiflora (Green milkweed) (E)

Araceae (Arum or aroid family)
Orontium aquaticum (Golden club, SC)

Araliaceae (Aralia or ivy family)
Hydrocotyle umbellata (Water pennywort, E) 
Hydrocotyle verticillata (Whorled pennywort, E) 
Panax quinquefolius (American ginseng, SC)

Aristolochiaceae (Birthwort family)
Endodeca serpentaria (Virginia snakeroot, SC a.k.a. Aristolochia serpentaria)

Aquifoliaceae (Holly family)
Ilex glabra (Inkberry, T, native populations only)

Asparagaceae
Maianthemum trifolium (Three-leaved false Solomon's-seal, T)

Aspleniaceae 
Asplenium montanum (Mountain spleenwort, SC)
Asplenium ruta-muraria (Wallrue spleenwort, T)
Diplazium pycnocarpon (Narrow-leaved glade fern, E)

Asteraceae (Aster, daisy, composite, or sunflower family)
Ageratina aromatica (Small white snakeroot, E)
Antennaria howellii ssp. petaloidea  (Field pussytoes, SCE)
Bidens beckii (Beck's water-marigold, SC) 
Bidens eatonii (Eaton's beggarticks, E)
Cirsium horridulum (Yellow thistle, E)
Doellingeria infirma (Appalachian white-aster, SCE) 
Eupatorium album (White thoroughwort, E)
Eurybia radula (Rough aster, E) 
Eurybia spectabilis (Showy aster, T)
Gamochaeta purpurea (Purple cudweed, SCE) 
Krigia biflora (Two-flowered cynthia, T) 
Liatris novae-angliae (New England blazing-star, SC) 
Oclemena nemoralis (Bog aster, E) 
Oligoneuron album  (Prairie goldenrod, a.k.a.  Solidago ptarmicoides, E)
Oligoneuron rigidum  (Stiff goldenrod, a.k.a. Solidago rigida, E) 
Packera anonyma (Small's ragwort, E) 
Packera paupercula (Balsam groundsel, E)
Petasites frigidus var. palmatus  (Sweet coltsfoot, T)
Pityopsis falcata (Sickle-leaved golden aster, E)
Polymnia canadensis (Small-flowered leafcup, E)
Senecio suaveolens (Sweet-scented Indian-plantain, E)
Solidago aestivalis (Early wrinkle-leaved goldenrod, SCE, also called rugosa) 
Solidago latissimifolia (Elliott's goldenrod, SCE)
Symphyotrichum prenanthoides (Crooked-stem aster, SCE)

Betulaceae (Birch family)
Betula pumila (Swamp birch, T)

Boraginaceae (Borage or forget-me-not family)
Cynoglossum virginianum (Wild comfrey, SC)
Hydrophyllum virginianum (Virginia waterleaf, SC)
Onosmodium virginianum (Gravel-weed E, a.k.a. Lithospermum virginianum)

Brassicaceae (Mustards, crucifers, or cabbage family)
Cardamine douglassii (Purple cress, SC)
Draba reptans (Whitlow-grass, SC)

Cactaceae (Cactus family)
Opuntia humifusa (Eastern prickly pear, SC)

Caprifoliaceae (Honeysuckle family)
Linnaea borealis ssp. americana (Twinflower, E)
Triosteum angustifolium (Narrow-leaved horse gentian, E)
Valerianella radiata (Beaked corn-salad, SCE)

Caryophyllaceae (Pink or carnation family)
Honckenya peploides (Seabeach sandwort, SC)
Minuartia glabra (Mountain sandwort, E) 
Moehringia macrophylla (Large-leaved sandwort, E)
Paronychia fastigiata (Hairy forked chickweed, SCE)
Silene stellata (Starry campion, T)
Spergularia canadensis (Canada sand-spurry, T)
Stellaria borealis (Northern stitchwort, SC)

Celastraceae (Staff vine or bittersweet family)
Celastrus scandens (American bittersweet, SC)

Cistaceae (Rock rose or Rock-rose family)
Crocanthemum dumosum (Bushy frostweed, SCE a.k.a. Helianthemum dumosum)
Crocanthemum propinquum (Low frostweed, SC a.k.a. Helianthemum propinquum)
Hudsonia ericoides (Golden heather, E)
Hudsonia tomentosa (Woolly beach-heather, T)
Lechea racemulosa (Illinois pinweed, SCE)

Cleomaceae
Polanisia dodecandra  (Clammy-weed, SCE)

Colchicaceae
Uvularia grandiflora (Large-flowered bellwort, E)

Convolvulaceae (Bindweed or morning glory family)
Calystegia silvatica (Short-stalked false bindweed, SCE) 
Calystegia spithamaea (Low bindweed, SCE)
Cuscuta coryli (Hazel dodder, SCE)

Crassulaceae (Stonecrop or orpine family)
Crassula aquatica (Pygmyweed, E)

Cupressaceae (Cypress family)
Thuja occidentalis (Northern white cedar, native populations only, T)

Cyperaceae (Sedge family)
Bolboschoenus maritimus ssp. paludosus (Bayonet Grass, SC) 
Bolboschoenus novae-angliae (Salt marsh bulrush, SC) 
Carex aestivalis (Summer sedge, SC)
Carex alata (Broadwing sedge, E) 
Carex alopecoidea (Foxtail sedge T)
Carex aquatilis ssp. altior (Water sedge, SC)
Carex backii (Back's sedge, E) 
Carex barrattii (Barratt's sedge, E) 
Carex bushii (Bush's sedge, SC) 
Carex buxbaumii (Brown bog sedge, E)
Carex castanea (Chestnut-colored sedge, E)
Carex collinsii (Collins' sedge, SCE)
Carex crawei (Crawe's sedge, T)
Carex crawfordii (Crawford sedge, SCE)
Carex cumulata (Clustered Sedge, T) 
Carex davisii (Davis' sedge, T)
Carex foenea  (Bronze sedge, SC a.k.a. Carex siccata)
Carex formosa (Handsome sedge, T)
Carex hitchcockiana (Hitchcock's sedge, SC) 
Carex limosa (Mud sedge, T)
Carex magellanica (Boreal bog sedge, E)
Carex molesta (Troublesome sedge, SC)
Carex nigromarginata (Black-edge sedge, SCE)
Carex novae-angliae (New England sedge, SC)
Carex oligocarpa (Eastern few-fruit sedge,  SC) 
Carex oligosperma (Few-seeded sedge, SCE) 
Carex pauciflora (Few-flowered sedge, SCE)
Carex polymorpha (Variable sedge, E) 
Carex prairea (Prairie sedge, SC)
Carex pseudocyperus (Cyperus-like sedge, E)
Carex reznicekii (Reznicek's sedge, E)
Carex schweinitzii (Schweinitz's sedge, E)
Carex siccata (Bronze sedge, SC)
Carex sterilis (Dioecious sedge, SC)
Carex trichocarpa (Hairy-fruited sedge, SC)
Carex tuckermanii (Tuckerman's sedge, SC)
Carex typhina (Cattail sedge, SC) 
Carex viridula (Little green sedge, E)
Carex willdenowii (Willdenow’s sedge, E)
Eleocharis equisetoides (Horsetail spikesedge, E)
Eleocharis microcarpa var. filiculmis (Small-fruited spikesedge, SCE) 
Eleocharis quadrangulata var. crassior (Square-stemmed spikesedge, E)
Eriophorum vaginatum var. spissum (Hare's tail, T)
Lipocarpha micrantha (Dwarf bulrush, T) 
Rhynchospora capillacea (Needle beaksedge, E)
Rhynchospora macrostachya (Tall beaksedge, T)  
Rhynchospora scirpoides (Long-beaked beaksedge, E)
Schoenoplectus acutus (Hard-stemmed bullrush, T) 
Schoenoplectus torreyi (Torrey bulrush, T)
Scirpus georgianus (Georgia bulrush, SCE)
Scirpus longii (Long's bulrush, SCE)
Scleria pauciflora var. caroliniana (Few-flowered nutrush, E)
Scleria reticularis (Reticulated nutrush, E)
Scleria triglomerata (Whip nutrush, E)
Scleria verticillata (Low nutrush, SCE)
Trichophorum alpinum (Alpine bulrush, SCE)

Droseraceae (Sundew family)
Drosera filiformis (Thread-leaf sundew, SCE)

Dryopteridaceae (Wood fern family)
Dryopteris campyloptera (Mountain wood-fern, E) 
Dryopteris goldieana (Goldie's fern, SC)

Equisetaceae (Horsetail family)
Equisetum palustre (Marsh horsetail, SCE) 
Equisetum pratense (Meadow horsetail, E) 
Equisetum scirpoides (Dwarf scouring rush, E)

Ericaceae (Heath or heather family)
Andromeda polifolia var. glaucophylla (Bog rosemary, T)
Gaultheria hispidula (Creeping snowberry, SC)
Gaylussacia bigeloviana (Dwarf huckleberry, T)
Lyonia mariana (Stagger-bush, SCE)
Moneses uniflora (One-flower wintergreen, E)
Orthilia secunda (One-sided pyrola, SCE)
Rhododendron groenlandicum (Labrador tea, T)
Vaccinium myrtilloides (Velvetleaf blueberry, E,)
Vaccinium vitis-idaea ssp. minus (Mountain cranberry, SCE)

Eriocaulaceae (Pipewort family)
Eriocaulon parkeri (Parker's pipewort, E)

Euphorbiaceae (Spurge family)
Acalypha virginica (Virginia copperleaf, SC) 
Crotonopsis elliptica (Elliptical rushfoil, SCE)

Fabaceae (Legume, pea, or bean family)
Desmodium cuspidatum (Large-bracted tick-trefoil, E)
Desmodium glabellum (Dillenius’ tick-trefoil, SC)
Desmodium sessilifolium (Sessile-leaf tick-trefoil, SCE)
Lespedeza repens (Creeping bush-clover, SC)
Phaseolus polystachios var. polystachios (Wild kidney bean, SCE) 
Senna hebecarpa (Wild senna, T)

Fagaceae
Quercus macrocarpa (Bur Oak, SC)

Gentianaceae
Gentianella quinquefolia (Stiff gentian, E)
Sabatia dodecandra (Large marsh pink, SCE) 
Sabatia stellaris (Marsh pink, E)

Geraniaceae
Geranium bicknellii (Bicknell's northern crane's-bill, SCE)

Grossulariaceae
Ribes glandulosum (Skunk currant, SC)
Ribes lacustre (Swamp black current, SCE)
Ribes rotundifolium (Wild current, SC)
Ribes triste (Swamp red currant, E)

Haemodoraceae (Bloodwort family)
Lachnanthes caroliniana (Carolina redroot native populations only, E)

Haloragaceae (Water-milfoil family)
Myriophyllum alterniflorum (Slender water-milfoil, E)
Myriophyllum pinnatum (Cutleaf water-milfoil, E) 
Myriophyllum sibiricum (Northern water-milfoil, T)

Hymenophyllaceae (Filmy ferns and bristle ferns)
Trichomanes intricatum (Appalachian gametophyte, SC)

Hypericaceae
Hypericum adpressum (Creeping St. John's-wort, SCE)
Hypericum ascyron (Great St. John's-wort, SC)

Juncaceae (Rush family)
Juncus debilis (Weak rush, SCE)

Lamiaceae (Mint or deadnettle family)
Agastache nepetoides (Yellow giant hyssop, E)
Agastache scrophulariifolia (Purple giant hyssop, E)
Blephilia ciliata (Downy wood-mint, SCE) 
Blephilia hirsuta (Hairy wood-mint, SCE) 
Lycopus amplectens (Clasping-leaved water-horehound, SC) 
Pycnanthemum torreyi (Torrey mountain-mint, E) 
Stachys hispida (Hispid hedge-nettle, T)
Stachys hyssopifolia (Hyssop-leaf hedge-nettle, E)
Scutellaria integrifolia (Hyssop skullcap, E) 
Scutellaria parvula var. missouriensis  (Small skullcap, E)
Trichostema brachiatum (False pennyroyal, E)

Lentibulariaceae (Bladderwort family)
Utricularia resupinata (Resupinate bladderwort, E)

Liliaceae (Lily family)
Streptopus amplexifolius (White mandarin, T)

Limnanthaceae
Floerkea proserpinacoides (False mermaid-weed, E)

Linaceae
Linum intercursum (Sandplain flax, SCE) 
Linum sulcatum (Yellow flax, E)

Lycopodiaceae
Huperzia appressa (Fir clubmoss, SCE)
Lycopodiella alopecuroides (Foxtail clubmoss, E)

Lygodiaceae
Lygodium palmatum (Climbing fern, SCE)

Lythraceae
Cuphea viscosissima (Blue waxweed, SCE)
Lythrum alatum (Winged loosestrife, E)
Rotala ramosior (Toothcup, T)

Melanthiaceae
Chamaelirium luteum (Devil's bit, E)
Veratrum latifolium (Hybrid bunchflower, SCE)

Nymphaeaceae (Water-lily family)
Nuphar advena (Large yellow pond lily, SCE)
Nuphar microphylla (Small yellow pond lily, SCE)

Onagraceae (Primrose or willowherb family)
Ludwigia polycarpa (Many-fruited false-loosestrife, SCE) 
Ludwigia sphaerocarpa (Globe-fruited false-loosestrife, E)
Oenothera fruticosa (Sundrops, SCE)

Orchidaceae (Orchid family)
Aplectrum hyemale (Puttyroot, SCE)
Arethusa bulbosa (Dragon's-mouth, SCE)
Coeloglossum viride (Long-bracted green orchid, E)
Corallorhiza trifida (Early coral root, SC)
Cypripedium arietinum (Ram's-head lady's-slipper, SCE)
Cypripedium parviflorum (Yellow lady's-slipper, SC)
Cypripedium reginae (Showy lady's-slipper, SC)
Goodyera repens var. ophioides (Dwarf rattlesnake plantain, SCE)
Isotria medeoloides (Small whorled pogonia, E, federally threatened)
Liparis liliifolia (Lily-leaved twayblade, E)
Malaxis bayardii (Bayard's white adder's mouth, SCE)
Malaxis brachypoda (White adder's-mouth, E)
Malaxis unifolia (Green adder's-mouth, E) 
Platanthera blephariglottis (White-fringed orchid, E)
Platanthera ciliaris (Yellow-fringed orchid, E) 
Platanthera dilatata (Tall white bog orchid, SCE) 
Platanthera flava var. herbiola (Pale green orchid, SC)
Platanthera hookeri (Hooker's orchid, SCE) 
Platanthera orbiculata (Large round-leaved orchid, SCE)
Triphora trianthophora (Nodding pogonia, E)
Spiranthes tuberosa var. grayi (Little ladies’-tresses, SC)

Ophioglossaceae (Adder's-tongue family)
Botrychium simplex (Little grape fern, SCE)
Ophioglossum pusillum (Northern adder's-tongue, E)
Ophioglossum vulgatum (Southern adder's-tongue, E)

Orobanchaceae (Broomrape family)
Agalinis acuta (Sandplain agalinis, E, Federally Endangered)
Castilleja coccinea (Indian paintbrush, E)
Pedicularis lanceolata (Swamp lousewort, T)
Schwalbea americana (Chaffseed, SCE, federally endangered)

Oxalidaceae (Wood sorrel family)
Oxalis violacea (Violet wood-sorrel, SC)

Papaveraceae (Poppy family)
Corydalis flavula (Yellow corydalis, T)
Dicentra canadensis (Squirrel corn, SC)

Plantaginaceae (Plantain family)
Plantago virginica (Hoary plantain, SC)

Pinaceae (Pine family)
Abies balsamea (Balsam fir, E, native populations only)
Pinus resinosa (Red pine, E, native populations only)

Poaceae (Grasses family)
Alopecurus aequalis (Short-awned meadow-foxtail, T)
Aristida longespica var. geniculata (Needlegrass, SC)
Aristida purpurascens (Arrowfeather, E)
Aristida tuberculosa (Beach needle grass, E)
Bouteloua curtipendula (Sideoats grama-grass, E)
Calamagrostis stricta ssp.  inexpansa (Bend reedgrass, T)
Coleataenia longifolia ssp. elongata (SCE) 
Deschampsia cespitosa (Tufted hairgrass, SC) 
Dichanthelium ovale ssp. pseudopubescens (Stiff-leaved rosette-panicgrass, SCE) 
Dichanthelium scabriusculum (Tall swamp rosette-panicgrass, E) 
Dichanthelium sphaerocarpon var. isophyllum (Round-fruited rosette panicgrass, SCE)
Dichanthelium xanthophysum (Pale-leaved rosette-panicgrass, SCE) 
Elymus wiegandii (Wiegand's wild rye, SC) 
Leptochloa fusca ssp. fascicularis (Saltpond grass, E) 
Milium effusum (Tall millet-grass, E)
Muhlenbergia capillaris (Long-awn hairgrass, E)
Panicum amarum var. amarum  (Bitter panicgrass, T) 
Panicum verrucosum (Warty panicgrass, SCE)
Paspalum laeve (Field paspalum, T) 
Paspalum setaceum var. psammophilum (Thin paspalum, SCE)
Piptatherum pungens (Slender mountain ricegrass, E) 
Phragmites americanus (American reed, SC) 
Puccinellia pumila (Goose grass, SCE) 
Schizachne purpurascens (Purple oat, SC)
Sporobolus clandestinus (Rough dropseed, E)
Sporobolus cryptandrus (Sand dropseed, T)
Sporobolus heterolepis (Northern dropseed, E) 
Sporobolus neglectus (Small dropseed, E)
Trisetum spicatum (Narrow false oats, E)

Polygalaceae (Milkwort family)
Polygala ambigua (Alternate milkwort, SC)
Polygala cruciata (Field milkwort, E) 
Polygala nuttallii (Nuttall's milkwort, T) 
Polygala senega (Seneca snakeroot, E)

Polygonaceae (Knotweed, smartweed, or buckwheat family)
Polygonum glaucum (Seabeach knotweed, SC)
Rumex persicarioides (Sea-side dock, SCE)

Pontederiaceae
Heteranthera reniformis (Kidneyleaf mud-plantain, SCE)

Potamogetonaceae (Pondweed family)
Potamogeton confervoides (Tuckerman's pondweed, E)
Potamogeton friesii (Fries' pondweed, E)
Potamogeton gemmiparus (Capillary pondweed, T)
Potamogeton hillii (Hill's pondweed, E)
Potamogeton ogdenii (Ogden's pondweed, E) 
Potamogeton strictifolius (Straight-leaved pondweed, E)
Potamogeton vaseyi (Vasey's pondweed, T)

Primulaceae (Primrose family)
Hottonia inflata (Featherfoil, SC)

Pteridaceae
Cheilanthes lanosa (Hairy lip-fern, E)
Cryptogramma stelleri (Slender cliff-brake, E) 
Pellaea glabella (Smooth cliff-brake, E)

Ranunculaceae (Buttercup or crowfoot family)
Anemone acutiloba (Sharp-lobed hepatica, SC)
Anemone canadensis (Canada anemone, T)
Hydrastis canadensis (Goldenseal, E)
Ranunculus ambigens (Water-plantain spearwort, E)
Ranunculus cymbalaria (Seaside crowfoot, E)
Ranunculus flammula var. reptans (Creeping spearwort, SCE)
Ranunculus pensylvanicus (Bristly buttercup, SC)
Trollius laxus (Spreading globe flower, T)

Rosaceae (Rose family)
Drymocallis arguta (Tall cinquefoil, SC)
Prunus alleghaniensis (Alleghany plum, SCE)
Prunus maritima var. gravesii (Graves beach plum, SCE)
Rosa nitida (Shining rose, SCE)
Rubus cuneifolius (Sand blackberry, SC) 
Rubus dalibarda (Dew-drop, E, Now called Dalibarda repens)
Sibbaldiopsis tridentata (Three-toothed cinquefoil, T)
Waldsteinia fragarioides (Barren strawberry, E)

Rubiaceae, (Coffee, madder, or bedstraw family)
Galium labradoricum (Bog bedstraw, E)
Houstonia longifolia (Longleaf bluet, T)

Salicaceae (Willow family)
Populus heterophylla (Swamp cottonwood, T)
Salix exigua (Sandbar willow, E) 
Salix pedicellaris (Bog willow, E)
Salix petiolaris (Slender willow, SC)

Santalaceae (Sandalwood family)
Arceuthobium pusillum (Dwarf mistletoe, E)

Saururaceae (Lizard tail family)
Saururus cernuus (Lizard's Tail, E)

Saxifragaceae
Mitella nuda (Naked miterwort, SC)

Scheuchzeriaceae
Scheuchzeria palustris ssp. Americana (Pod grass, E)

Scrophulariaceae (Figwort family)
Limosella australis (Mudwort, SC)

Smilacaceae (Greenbrier family)
Smilax hispida (Bristly greenbriar, SCE)

Typhaceae
Sparganium fluctuans (Floating bur-reed, E)
Sparganium natans (Small bur-reed, E)

Verbenaceae (Verbena or vervain family)
Verbena simplex (Narrow-leaved vervain, SC)

Violaceae (Violet family)
Hybanthus concolor (Green violet, SCE)
Viola adunca (Hook-spurred violet, E)  
Viola brittoniana (Coast violet, E) 
Viola canadensis (Canada violet, SC)
Viola hirsutula (Southern wood violet, SCE)
Viola nephrophylla (Northern bog violet, SC)
Viola renifolia (Kidney-leaf white violet, E)
Viola selkirkii (Great-spurred violet, SC)

Xyridaceae
Xyris montana (Northern yellow-eyed grass, T) 
Xyris smalliana (Small's yellow-eyed, E)

References
"Connecticut's Endangered, Threatened and Special Concern Species 2015". State of Connecticut Department of Energy and Environmental Protection Bureau of Natural Resources. Retrieved 1 February 2018. (Note: This list is newer than the one used by plants.usda.gov and is more up-to-date.)

Flora of the Northeastern United States
Natural history of Connecticut
Lists of flora of Connecticut

Lists of plants by conservation status
Connecticut